The following is a list of mayors (alcaldes) of Alicante since 1669.

Mayors after the establishment of the statutes of Alicante in 1669

Mayors during the Bourbon Restoration

Mayors during the dictatorship of Primo de Rivera (1923-1931)

Mayors during the Second Republic (1931-1939)

Mayors during the dictatorship of Francisco Franco (1939-1976)

Mayors during the Transition (1976-1979)

Mayors since the Constitution of 1978 (1979-Now)

Timeline since 1979

References

Alicante